Tim Molloy is a New Zealand illustrator and comic artist, living and working in Melbourne.  Molloy's work has appeared in Tango, Torpedo and Desktop Magazine. In 2007 he published a collection of his comic art as Under the Bed. Since 2006 he has collaborated with writer Adam Lachlan to produce Life on Earth cartoons. Recently he has published two graphic novels, It Shines and Shakes and Laughs and Mr Unpronounceable Adventures through Australian publisher, Milk Shadow Books.

As a promotion for the web series Zombies On Ramsay Street, Molloy was employed to zombify a number of press social media profiles. He gave the same treatment to MyM magazine's official mascot Mya Tenshi, in Issue 31.

External links
 Tim Molloy on tumblr.com
 Tim Molloy at Beinart Gallery Available art & biography

References

New Zealand comics artists
Living people
Year of birth missing (living people)